Fiber pull-out is one of the failure mechanisms in fiber-reinforced composite materials. Other forms of failure include delamination, intralaminar matrix cracking, longitudinal matrix splitting, fiber/matrix debonding, and fiber fracture. The cause of fiber pull-out and delamination is weak bonding.

Work for debonding,  

where
 is fiber diameter
 is failure strength of the fiber
 is the length of the debonded zone
 is fiber modulus

In ceramic matrix composite material this mechanism is not a failure mechanism, but essential for its fracture toughness, which is several factors above that of conventional ceramics.

The figure is an example of how a fracture surface of this material looks like. The strong fibers form bridges over the cracks before they fail at elongations around 0.7%, and thus prevent brittle rupture of the material at 0.05%, especially under thermal shock conditions. This allows using this type of ceramics for heat shields applied for the re-entry of space vehicles, for disk brakes and slide bearing components.

References 

Composite materials